Tym or TYM may refer to:
 Tym (Ob), a river in Krasnoyarsk Krai and Tomsk Oblast, Russia
 Tym (Sakhalin), a river on Sakhalin Island, Russia
 Alice Tym (born 1942), American tennis player
 Stanisław Tym (born 1937), Polish artist, directory and writer
 Joseph John "Tym" Tymczyszyn (1918–1999), American test pilot
 TYM Guitars, an Australian guitar manufacturer
 TYM (Tong Yang Moolsan), a South Korean agricultural machinery manufacturing company